Misterija is the debut album by the Serbian pop singer Dunja Ilić. Two music videos with songs from this albums have been released - "Bidermajer" and "Misterija". The album deals with gothic and passionate themes, and in some songs, even morbid ones. The main influences are revenge, forbidden love affairs, fear, death and dark secrets.  At least some of the songs in the album are unacknowledged cover versions of other songs, for example "Bidermajer" is a cover of the song "Hob Mayous meno" (2008) performed by Samira Said, and "Ceo Vek Sam Starija" is a cover of the song "Ah Min Hawak" (2002), performed by Elissa.

Track listing
 Misterija (Mistery) (music video was released in 2010)
 Bidermajer (music video was released in late 2009)
 Ustaj Bre, I Bori Se (Get Up, and Fight)
 Domino Dama (Dominatrix)
 Zla Heroina (Evil Heroine)
 Ceo Vek Sam Starija (A Century Older)
 Luksuzni Apartman (Luxury Apartment)
 Seks, Smrt, Pare, Moc I Slava (Sex, Death, Money, Power and Fame)
 Durbin (Spyglass)
 Jedino Sto Pamtim I Postujem (The Only Thing I Remember and Respect)

Dunja Ilić albums
2010 albums